Lorine Schild (born 6 January 2005) is a French figure skater. She is the 2022 Tallink Hotels Cup bronze medalist and a two-time French national silver medalist. On the junior level, she is the 2022 European Youth Olympic Festival champion.

Personal life 
Schild was born on 6 January 2005 in Reims, France. She has a younger sister, Maëlle, who previously also competed in figure skating. As of 2022, Schild is a high school student.

Programs

Competitive highlights 
JGP: Junior Grand Prix

References

External links 
 
 

2005 births
Living people
French female single skaters
Sportspeople from Reims